Emily Grove is a pole vaulter from the Pontiac, Illinois.

IHSA
Grove is a two-time Illinois High School Association state champion in the pole vault representing Pontiac Township High School. Grove also placed seventh in the 4x200-meter relay and 4x400-meter relay. Grove as a sophomore finished fourth in the pole vault at the state meet. Grove also participated in cross country and volleyball.

NCAA
Groves competed for the University of South Dakota, earning All-American honors six times, Academic All-American honors, and graduated in 2017.  She was also a four time Summit League champion.

During her senior season, she cleared fifteen feet and at one point led the nation, but finished 15th at the NCAA Championships.

International career
At the 2017 USA Outdoor Track and Field Championships, Grove finished tied for 3rd, but won in a jump-off in her first attempt.  This qualified her for the 2017 World Championships in Athletics in London.

References

External links

 Emily Grove profile on Twitter
 Emily Grove profile on Instagram

1993 births
Living people
American female pole vaulters
World Athletics Championships athletes for the United States
Track and field athletes from Illinois
Sportspeople from Illinois
University of South Dakota alumni
South Dakota Coyotes athletes
21st-century American women